Target of EGR1 protein 1 is a protein that in humans is encoded by the TOE1 gene.

References

Further reading